The Basay are an aboriginal people of Taiwan. Their ancestors spoke the Basay language.

See also
 Formosan languages
 Taiwanese indigenous peoples

Ancient peoples
Taiwanese indigenous peoples